Cécile Bayiha is an actress from Cameroon
She is best known for playing the part of captive Pygmy Likola in the 2005 Franco-British-South African film Man to Man, in which two captured Pygmies are presented to a 19th-century British public. Bayiha is not a Pygmy herself, but a short-statured person or "proportionate dwarf".

References

External links
 

Living people
Democratic Republic of the Congo actresses
Actors with dwarfism
Year of birth missing (living people)
21st-century Democratic Republic of the Congo people